Kenneth Schuermans (born 25 May 1991) is a Belgian professional footballer who plays for Deinze in the Belgian First Division B. He plays as a central defender. From 2009 to 2017 he played for Westerlo and before 2009 he played for seventh tier club Verbroedering Maasmechelen.

Career

Verbroedering Maasmechelen
Schuermans started playing football at Verbroedering Maasmechelen, where he progressed through the youth teams and finally made the first team competing in the Belgian Provincial Leagues. During this period he briefly worked as a mail carrier. Eventually, professional club Westerlo discovered him and signed him to their youth team.

Westerlo
On 3 March 2012, Schuermans made his official debut for Westerlo against Lokeren, coming on as a half-time substitute for Evariste Ngolok in a 4–0 loss. He would eventually suffer relegation with Westerlo that season to the second division. From the 2012–13 season, he became a permanent starter in the second division for Westerlo. On 13 October 2012, he scored his first goal of his professional career against RWDM Brussels. In the 2013–14 season he won the second division title with Westerlo and thus promoted to the Belgian First Division A. Also in the 2014–15 season, he was a starter in defense.

Oud-Heverlee Leuven
On 19 May 2017, Schuermans signed with Oud-Heverlee Leuven after playing for Westerlo for 6 years. There, he immediately grew into a starter, and he occasionally managed to score as well, managing 5 goals in 89 appearances.

Lierse Kempenzonen
On 21 May 2021, he signed with Lierse Kempenzonen on a one-year contract. He made his debut on 13 August in a 1–1 away draw against Deinze. The following week, on 22 August, Schuermans scored a brace on two headers to secure a 2–0 win over Virton. He scored again the following week in a 2–3 loss to his former club Westerlo. On 12 September, he scored his fourth league goal in four matches as Lierse Kempenzonen beat RWDM 4–1.

References

External links

1991 births
Living people
Sportspeople from Genk
Footballers from Limburg (Belgium)
Belgian footballers
K.V.C. Westerlo players
Oud-Heverlee Leuven players
Lierse Kempenzonen players
K.M.S.K. Deinze players
Belgian Pro League players
Challenger Pro League players
Association football defenders